Nigel Edward Doughty (10 June 1957 – 4 February 2012) was a British investor and football club owner, who was co-chairman and co-founder of Doughty Hanson & Co, a European private equity firm based in London.

Doughty was born in Newark, Nottinghamshire.  Doughty Hanson & Co traces its history back to 1985 when Doughty and Richard Hanson began working together on European investments. Doughty completed his Cranfield BA in 1984 and became a Distinguished Alumnus of the Cranfield School of Management in 2004.  He made a personal donation in 2006 to establish the Doughty Centre for Corporate Responsibility at Cranfield School of Management. He was also President of The Cranfield Trust. Doughty was a Trustee of the Doughty Family Foundation and the Doughty Hanson Charitable Foundation.

Around 2010, Doughty was an Assistant Treasurer of the Labour Party and Chairman of the Small Business Taskforce policy review. He was a member of the World Economic Forum in Davos.

Doughty bought control of Nottingham Forest F.C. for £11 million in 1999. After the departure of Steve McClaren as Forest manager in October 2011, Doughty announced his decision to step down as Forest chairman by the end of the 2011–12 season. Doughty's son Michael is a professional footballer.

On 4 February 2012, Doughty was found dead in the gymnasium of his home in Skillington, Lincolnshire. His death was due to Sudden Arrhythmic Death Syndrome (SADS).

Notes

External links
Doughty Hanson & Co

1957 births
2012 deaths
Private equity and venture capital investors
People from Newark-on-Trent
English financial businesspeople
Alumni of Cranfield University
People educated at Magnus Church of England School
English football chairmen and investors
Labour Party (UK) officials
Nottingham Forest F.C.
20th-century English businesspeople